The full discography of American rock musician Mark Tremonti consists of five studio albums, three concert films, one extended play, one compilation album, and 30 singles in total, in addition to seven studio tracks on which he has appeared as a featured artist. Born in Detroit, Michigan, on April 18, 1974, Tremonti is currently the lead guitarist of the rock bands Creed and Alter Bridge, and is also the lead vocalist and lead guitar player for his own band, Tremonti, with five albums, All I Was, Cauterize, Dust, A Dying Machine, and Marching in Time.

Studio albums

Singles

Music videos

Compilation albums

Extended plays

Concert films

As featured artist

a. Tremonti also serves as a co-producer on tracks 4–7 and 10–11 from this album.

See also
 Creed discography
 Alter Bridge discography

References

External links
 

Rock music discographies
Discographies of American artists
Heavy metal discographies